Katrina Jade "Kate" Leth (born 1988) is a Canadian comic book creator, known for works such as Patsy Walker, A.K.A. Hellcat!.

Career
Leth was born in Ottawa and lives in Halifax, Nova Scotia, and attended NSCAD University, studying photography. She dropped out before achieving her degree.

Comics
She worked at the Strange Adventures comic shop in Halifax, where she developed an interest in comics, and created promotional art for the shop. In 2010, she created her webcomic Kate or Die for their blog. Kate or Die eventually became a bi-weekly column on Comics Alliance.  She cited fellow Nova Scotia writer Kate Beaton as an influence, "...this person who was putting all this stuff out there, and no real formal art school training, but was doing really well with her work." Leth also contributed to the webcomics Locke & Key: Guide to the Known Keys and The Strange Talent of Luther Strode, and the anthology, Womanthologoy: Heroic. She later contributed to Smut Peddler in 2012.

Leth's Adventure Time fan art on her Tumblr page attracted the attention of BOOM! Studios, publishers of the comic based on the television show. She was hired to do covers, a short story, and a graphic novel, Adventure Time: Seeing Red, which entered The New York Times Best Seller list in April 2014. She also was a co-writer and co-artist for issue 3 of Adventure Time with Fionna and Cake, Adventure Time: Bitter Sweets, and Adventure Time: The Four Castles. 

In 2013, Leth organized The Valkyries, a group of women who work in comics retail. In 2017, Leth described the group as "great for creating a community" and equivalent to a union. The group was disbanded in 2018, due to accusations that the group failed to adequately represent the concerns of women of color due to Leth's deliberate mismanagement. 

In 2015, Leth wrote another comic for Boom!, Power Up, and wrote six issues of Vampirella for Dynamite Entertainment. Leth was co-host for Less Than Live with Kate or Die, a bi-weekly comics podcast which last aired in 2016. Leth collaborated with the podcast Welcome to Night Vale and wrote stories for the Lumberjanes comic for Boom!. In 2018, Lumberjanes, the comic to which Leth contributed along with 5 other creators, was nominated for a GLAAD Media Award. She also worked on Transformers: Galaxies, an anthology comic book series by IDW Publishing which is a spin-off to 2019's Transformers comic book, which began on September 25, 2019 and concluded on December 30, 2020.

Leth was also the cover artist for various webcomics. This included Adventure Time: Marceline and the Scream Queens #5 in 2012, The Midas Flesh #3 in 2013, Littlest Pet Shop #2 and Lumberjanes #1 in 2014, and Swords of Sorrow. Additionally, she was a variant cover artist of Sex Criminals #12.

Animation
Leth wrote for the 2018 Bravest Warriors episode "Chained to Your Side". The same year, the three episodes of Polly Pocket, two episodes of Craig of the Creek,the Littlest Pet Shop: A World of Our Own episode "The Purr-fect Storm", the My Little Pony: Friendship is Magic episode "Mystery Voice" and 17 episodes of Transformers: Cyberverse she had written were released. Additionally, from 2018 to 2019, the five episodes of My Little Pony: Equestria Girls were released. She had previously contributed to Bravest Warriors comics in 2012 and two graphic novels of Mysticons in 2018 and 2019.

In 2021, the series High Guardian Spice was released on Crunchyroll. Leth co-wrote four episodes for the seasons, and two other episodes individually. Leth also appeared in the 2014 documentary She Makes Comics and in the 2016 episode "Paper Plate Pictionary" of Super Fun Awesome Party Game Time. From 2016 to 2017, she voiced Sira the Unbidden in the series Vast.

Other writings
In 2014, Leth wrote for Jim Henson's Fraggle Rock: Journey to the Everspring, and Edward Scissorhands In 2015, Leth worked with Joe Quinones to pitch Batman ’89 as a comic series, but DC Comics rejected it.

For Marvel she wrote Secret Wars, Too a comedic anthology, and Patsy Walker, A.K.A. Hellcat!, for 17 issues. In 2016, Leth wrote for the graphic novel, School Spirit. From October 2016 to February 2017, she contributed to issues 1-5 of Spell on Wheels, co-writing with Megan Levens.

In 2020, Leth announced she had signed a deal with Simon and Schuster to produce a graphic novel for release in 2023 entitled Mall Goth.

Personal life
Leth lived in Burbank, California from January 2016 until September 2020, when she moved back to Halifax, Nova Scotia. While in college, Leth and her colleague Vincenzo Ravina created a website dedicated to their hatred of the Crocs shoes. She is openly bisexual and non-binary and uses both she/her and they/them pronouns. She has also described herself as queer and genderfluid.

In September 2019, Leth announced via Twitter that she was engaged to longtime partner Cohen Edenfield.

Bibliography
 The Strange Talent of Luther Strode (2011)
 Locke & Key: Guide to the Known Keys (2011)
 Womanthologoy: Heroic (2011)
 Bravest Warriors (2012) – writer for issues #21-36 art by Ian McGinty
 Smut Peddler (2012)
 Adventure Time with Fionna and Cake (2013) – co-writer and co-artist for issue #3
 Adventure Time: Seeing Red (2014) – writer
 Adventure Time: Bitter Sweets (2014)– writer
 Adventure Time: The Four Castles (2016) – writer
 Jim Henson's Fraggle Rock: Journey to the Everspring (2014)
 Edward Scissorhands (2014) – writer
 Power Up (2015)
 School Spirit (2016)

Dark Horse Comics 
 Spell on Wheels #1–5 (with Megan Levens, October 2016–February 2017)
 Mysticons: Volume 1 (September 21, 2018)
 Mysticons: Volume 2 (March 2019)

Marvel Comics 
 Secret Wars Too (story "Pizza Quest", with Brittney Williams; November 2015)
 Amazing Spider-Man: Renew Your Vows #1 (story "Make It Work", with Marguerite Sauvage; November 2016)
 Patsy Walker, A.K.A. Hellcat! #1–17 (with Brittney Williams, December 2015–April 2017)

Dynamite Comics 
 Vampirella #1–6 (with Eman Casallos, March 2016–August 2016)

The Teenager Corporation 

 Mr Boop Vol II (August 2020)
 Guest Strip: Commitment

Covers 
 Adventure Time: Marceline and the Scream Queens #5 (cover artist) (2012)
 The Midas Flesh #3 (cover artist) (2013)
 Littlest Pet Shop #2 (cover artist) (2014)
 Lumberjanes #1 (cover artist) (2014)
 Sex Criminals #12 (variant cover artist)
 Swords of Sorrow (cover artist) (2015)

Filmography

Film

Television

Notes

References

External links
 
 

1988 births
Living people
Artists from Nova Scotia
Canadian comics artists
Canadian comics writers
Canadian expatriate writers in the United States
Canadian webcomic creators
Cartoon Network Studios people
LGBT comics creators
Marvel Comics writers
Marvel Comics people
Canadian LGBT artists
Bisexual artists
Bisexual writers
Queer artists
Writers from Halifax, Nova Scotia
Non-binary artists
Genderfluid people